The following lists events that happened during 1976 in Chile.

Incumbents
President of Chile: Augusto Pinochet

Events

January
January 5 - The Archbishop of Santiago, Raúl Silva Henríquez, creates the Vicariate of Solidarity.
January 25 - Operation Tucán begins, in which the aim was to organize a group of sympathetic Human Rights activists, and to incite the United Nations to generate negative press against the military government of General Augusto Pinochet.

February
February 8 - The newspaper La Estrella de Arica is founded.
February 9 - The XVII International Song Festival of Viña del Mar is held. Hosted by Antonio Vodanovic, his debut, and Ana María Thieman.
February 18 - United States suspends military aid to Chile.

March
March 25 - San Pablo Hospital is inaugurated in the city of Coquimbo.
March 30 - Polla Gol officially begins, a game of chance by Polla Chilena de Beneficencia that is based on guessing the results of the week's soccer matches.

April

May

June
June 4 - The VI Assembly of the Organization of American States begins, held in the Diego Portales Building in Santiago. All OAS member countries are presented with the exception of Mexico. The meeting lasted for 10 days.

July
July 12 - It snows over part of the country, between the Santiago Metropolitan Region and the Araucanía Region.
July 30 - Apsi magazine begins to circulate, opposing the Military Government.

August
August 6 - The Ministry of the Interior expels from the country the Christian Democrat lawyers and political leaders Jaime Castillo Velasco and the radical Eugenio Velasco Letelier.

September
The Social Democratic Labor Movement is constituted.
September 12 - On a beach in Los Molles (Valparaíso Region) the body of the communist teacher Marta Ugarte, arrested on August 9, 1976, is found.
21 September – Letelier assassination

October
October 14 - The first issue of Cosas magazine appears with the French singer Sylvie Vartan on its cover.
October 19 - The first Santa Isabel supermarket is inaugurated in Valparaíso.
October 30 - Chile leaves the Andean Pact, due to differences regarding foreign investments.

November
November 18 - The broadcasts of the informative El Diario de Cooperativa begin through Radio Cooperativa.

December
December 15 - Luis Werner discovers the archaeological site of Monte Verde.
December 18 - The exchange of political prisoners Luis Corvalán and Vladímir Bukovski reestablish diplomatic relations between Chile and the Soviet Union.
December 28 - Augusto Pinochet appoints Sergio de Castro as the new Minister of Finance, who will replace Jorge Cauas.

Births
4 February – Carlos Toro
12 February – Moisés Villarroel
2 March – Mario Núñez
9 March – Mauricio Aros
19 March – Cristóbal Cobo
31 May – Tonka Tomicic
27 July – Soledad Onetto
1 September – Sebastián Rozental
24 September – Alejandro Osorio
31 December – Patricio Galaz

Deaths
16 July – Carmelo Soria (b. 1921)
12 August – Carlos Frödden (b. 1887)
21 September – Orlando Letelier (b. 1932)
28 November – Humberto Elgueta (b. 1904)

References 

 
Years of the 20th century in Chile
Chile